Mahmatlı can refer to:

 Mahmatlı, Gölbaşı
 Mahmatlı, Sungurlu
 Mahmatlı, Vezirköprü